Rakuen (Japanese "paradise" 楽園 らくえん)  may refer to:

Music

Albums
Rakuen (album), a 2004 album by Yui Horie
Rakuen, a 2001 album by Laputa

Songs
"Rakuen" (Do As Infinity song), a single by Do As Infinity 2004
"Rakuen", song by The Yellow Monkey 1996
"Rakuen", song by Yuki Uchida 1999 
"Rakuen", song by Arashi from Popcorn
"Rakuen", song by Mutyumu from "-il y a-" album
"Rakuen", song by Fujifabric from "Paradise" album
"Rakuen", song by SADS from "Masquerade" single

Video games
Rakuen (video game), a 2017 video game developed by Laura Shigihara

See also
 "Lakuen", a 2000 single by Ken Hirai